Bowlan Township is a defunct township in Shannon County, in the U.S. state of Missouri.

Bowlan Township was established in 1842, and named after the local Bowlin family, although the spelling is different.

References

Townships in Missouri
Townships in Shannon County, Missouri